Pamela Westmore is a Hollywood make-up artist and part of the third generation of the Westmore family.  The granddaughter of Wally Westmore, she has worked on over 50 productions since 1982, including acting as Sandra Bullock's chief makeup artist.

Selected filmography
 Rambo: First Blood Part II
 Elvira, Mistress of the Dark
 Free Willy
 The Divine Secrets of the Ya-Ya Sisterhood
 Gravity

See also

Westmore family

References

External links
 

American make-up artists
Living people
Year of birth missing (living people)
Pamela